Yu Hongyang (born October 1957) is a Chinese ambassador. From October 2008 to July 2010 he was ambassador to Amman (Jordan). From July 2010 to May 2014 he was ambassador to Tehran (Iran). Between July 2014 and December 2018, he was China's ambassador in Ankara (Turkey)

References

1957 births
Living people
People from Jiangsu
Ambassadors of China to Jordan
Ambassadors of China to Iran
Ambassadors of China to Turkey
Politicians from Jiangsu